Saint Clement School
 Saint Clement School, in Massachusetts
 St. Clement School, of the Saint Clement Catholic Church, Chicago